Soil Festivities is a studio album by the Greek electronic composer Vangelis, released in October 1984.

Overview
This 1984 release was the first in what could be very loosely said to belong to a trilogy of his 1980s albums, the other two being Invisible Connections and Mask, both from the following year (1985). It is a concept album which derived inspiration from the natural elements, life processes taking place on the Earth's surface and beneath our feet.

He recalls that it "was made because I wanted to make music, not sell a million records. I don’t think it’s possible to guarantee commercial success for an album anyway, because nobody really knows what is commercial and what isn’t. Even if I went out of my way to make an album that was more accessible to the public, that would not guarantee its commercial success''".

The album cover art features the rear view of a great diving beetle.

Release
The album reached #55 position in the UK album charts, and #45 position in the Netherlands album charts in 1984.

Composition
Vangelis uses exotic synth-harmonies, creative percussion and melody-lines, as well as rare use of double bass plucking sounds.

The first movement is accompanied by storm and rain-effects, and on top of this is loose improvisational skills to probably indicate the many forms of life springing into existence. The second movement has tune-like quality, and is the most tranquil piece, in contrast to the next three which are darker in atmosphere.

The third movement shows the violent side of nature, indicating the struggle to survive, whilst the fourth movement is more contemplative and a bit gloomy, perhaps indicating slowed-down nightlife activity.

The fifth movement is a wonderfully loose piece of improvisation, going through many moods and tempos before setting up an emotional conclusion to the life.

Reception

Jim Brenholts of Allmusic notes that Vangelis "surrounds a subtle drone with heavy sequences and dense atmospheres. He uses a symphonic synth to create pastoral textures", and that it "is a very accessible album".

Track listing 
All songs composed by Vangelis.
 "Movement 1"  – 18:20
 "Movement 2"  – 6:20
 "Movement 3"  – 6:06
 "Movement 4"  – 9:54
 "Movement 5"  – 7:20

Personnel
Vangelis – keyboards and composer

Production
Vangelis – producer, arranger
Jess Sutcliffe – engineer
Vangelis, Alwyn Clayden – design

References

External links
 Soil Festivities at Vangelis Collector

Vangelis albums
Polydor Records albums
1984 albums